The following is a list of published bryophyte floras covering counties or other local areas of Britain, together with a list of vascular plant floras which also contain bryophyte lists.

Full bryophyte floras

England
 Hill, Mark O. and Bryan Edwards (2003) The Mosses and Liverworts of Dorset 
 Perry, Irene G. (2001) Bryophyte Atlas of Exmoor National Park

Wales
 Bosanquet, Sam et al. (2005) The Mosses and Liverworts of Carmarthenshire 
 Woods, R. G. (2006) The Mosses and Liverworts of Brecknock

Vascular plant floras containing bryophyte lists
 Bowen, Humphry (2000) The Flora of Dorset  (Chapter 7, Dorset Bryophytes, pp. 290 – 302)
Linton, William Richardson (1903) Flora of Derbyshire: Flowering Plants, Higher Cryptogams, Mosses and Hepatics, Characeae. London: Bemrose, pp. 337–421

See also
 A Checklist and Census Catalogue of British and Irish Bryophytes (book)

Flora of the United Kingdom
Lists of biota of the United Kingdom